Lindsay Hollister (born June 3, 1977) is an American actress.

Biography
Hollister was born in Columbus, Ohio. She graduated from Pickerington High School and earned a Bachelor of Fine Arts Degree in Theatre Performance from Miami University in Oxford, Ohio.

She has appeared in many American television shows, including Boston Public, Popular, Days of Our Lives, ER, Cold Case, Nip/Tuck and Law & Order: Special Victims Unit.

She appeared as Nell Goldman in the Scrubs episode "My Boss's Free Haircut",  Laurie Dunne in Cold Case episode "The Promise", Xena in the My Name Is Earl episode "O Karma, Where Art Thou?", and Maureen in the Desperate Housewives episode "No One Is Alone".

She appears in the following films: Bachelor Party Vegas in 2006, From Bubba With Love and Postal in 2007, Disfigured and Get Smart in 2008 as Steve Carell's dance partner.

Hollister starred as the title character in the 2011 Uwe Boll film Blubberella.  In an interview with Popzara Press'''s Brittany Vincent, she states she took the role because of diminishing opportunities for overweight actresses to find work in Hollywood.  "I’ve been doing this for ten years. While I’ve been extremely lucky to play some amazing characters, I’ve watched the roles dry up. And I’ve been shut out of even auditioning for many character roles because I’m too large."  On taking on the title role of Blubberella'', she states "This movie would have been done with or without me. It would have been a lot more offensive if I hadn’t done it. But I didn’t win the war about the title. I hate the title."

Filmography

References

Further reading

External links

1977 births
American film actresses
American television actresses
Living people
Actresses from Columbus, Ohio
Miami University alumni
21st-century American actresses